Gnorimus is genus of beetles belonging to the family  Scarabaeidae, subfamily Cetoniinae.

Etymology
The genus name Gnorimus derives from the ancient Greek γνώριμος, gnōrimos meaning 'famous'.

Species
 Gnorimus armeniacus
 Gnorimus baborensis
 Gnorimus bartelsi
 Gnorimus decempunctatus
 Gnorimus nobilis
 Gnorimus subcostatus
 Gnorimus subopacus
 Gnorimus variabilis

References

Cetoniinae
Beetles of Europe